Balanites pedicellaris, the small green-thorn or small torchwood is a small tree or shrub from Sub-Saharan Africa. It is a member of the caltrop family Zygophyllaceae.

Description
Balanites pedicellaris is a multi-stemmed shrub or small tree, although some specimens may have a single fluted trunk. The branches are yellowish or greyish-green, bearing simple green spines. The leaves are alternate or grow on the spines, bifoliolate; the leaflets obovate, pale green, rather fleshy, down covered with a short downy petiole. The greenish-white flowers have 6 petals and are bunched in small, axillary clusters, approximately 1.4 cm in diameter. The fruit is a drupe, which is round or ellipsoid and normally flattened on either end, it measures 1·2–2·5 × 1·5–2 cm., the unripe fruit is usually covered in downy hairs but these are lost on the ripe fruit which is orange in colour. Grows up to 6m tall.

Distribution
Balanites pedicellaris occurs from Ethiopia and Somalia south through eastern Africa to KwaZulu Natal in South Africa.

Habitat
Balanites pedicellaris is found in dry woodland and scrub and on alluvial soils on floodplains, where there are scattered trees.

Uses
The fruit is eaten but is not sought after. The fresh fruits are toxic and have a bitter taste, consumption causes thirst, dizziness and vomiting. An infusion made from the roots is used to treat fever and diarrhoea, the boiled root infusion is frequently added to milk given to children. The root infusion is used as an emetic by the Turkana people. The seeds are cooked and are an important source of food in northern Kenya, particularly in Turkana. The leaves are used as browse for domestic animals while the wood is used for carvings and to make torches.

References

pedicellaris
Trees of Africa
Flora of Northeast Tropical Africa
Flora of East Tropical Africa
Flora of South Tropical Africa
Trees of Botswana
Flora of Mozambique
Flora of Rwanda
Flora of Zimbabwe
Edible plants
Plants used in traditional African medicine